The 1993 IBF World Championships (World Badminton Championships) were held in Birmingham, England in 1993.

Venue
National Indoor Arena

Medalists

Medal table

Events

External links
BWF Results

 
BWF World Championships
World Championships
Badminton
International sports competitions in Birmingham, West Midlands
Badminton tournaments in England